The French Prealps are a group of subalpine mountain ranges of medium elevation located immediately west of the French Alps. They roughly stretch from Lake Geneva southwest to the rivers Isère and Drôme; east to a line running from Chamonix, to Albertville, to Grenoble, to Gap, to Barcelonette; and south from Grasse to Vence.

In the northern subalpine regions, the various ranges are easily identifiable by geographical separations, such as the Voreppe Gorge between Vercors and Chartreuse, or Chambéry, which sits in a valley between the Bauges and Chartreuse ranges. In the southern subalpine regions, the ranges are generally disorganized and lack the wide, deep valleys that divide them in the north.

Three non-contiguous ranges traditionally comprise the southern French Prealps: the Alpilles, Mont Sainte-Victoire and Sainte-Baume.

Ranges and peaks

Among the best known peaks in the French Prealps are:
Mont Ventoux, near Carpentras, Vaucluse, called the "Giant of Provence" 
Mont Aiguille, near Chichilianne, Isère, which has a distinctive broad flat top,

References

L'Organisation structurale des Alpes françaises (French)
 Raoul Blanchard (1938–1956), Les Alpes Occidentales. Paris: Édition Arthaud. (French)
 Roger Frison-Roche (1964), Les montagnes de la terre. Paris: Flammarion. (French)

Mountain ranges of the Alps
Mountain ranges of Auvergne-Rhône-Alpes
Mountain ranges of Provence-Alpes-Côte d'Azur

pt:Pré-Alpes